Thomas Edward Johnston (born September 8, 1967) is the  Chief United States district judge of the United States District Court for the Southern District of West Virginia.

Education and career

Born in Charleston, West Virginia, Johnston received a Bachelor of Arts degree from West Virginia University in 1989 and a Juris Doctor from West Virginia University College of Law in 1992.  He was a law clerk for Judge Frederick Pfarr Stamp Jr. of the United States District Court for the Northern District of West Virginia from 1992 to 1994. He was in private practice in Wheeling, West Virginia, from 1994 to 2001. He was the United States Attorney for the Northern District of West Virginia from 2001 to 2006.

Federal judicial service

Johnston is a United States District Judge of the United States District Court for the Southern District of West Virginia. Johnston was nominated by President George W. Bush on September 28, 2005, to a seat vacated by Charles Harold Haden II. He was confirmed by the United States Senate on March 6, 2006, and received his commission on April 17, 2006. He became Chief Judge on September 5, 2017.

References

Sources

1967 births
Living people
Judges of the United States District Court for the Southern District of West Virginia
Lawyers from Charleston, West Virginia
United States Attorneys for the Northern District of West Virginia
United States district court judges appointed by George W. Bush
West Virginia University alumni
West Virginia University College of Law alumni
21st-century American judges